The Culebrinas River (pron. koo-le-BREE-nahs), is a river in northwest Puerto Rico. It originates in southwestern Lares for  till it empties into the Mona Passage south of downtown Aguadilla. It goes through Lares, San Sebastián, Moca, Aguada and Aguadilla municipalities. It is 37.33 miles long and when it floods causes damage to infrastructure in a number of municipalities.

Variant names and meaning 
Culebrina is Spanish for "forked lightning". In maps the river name has been spelled different ways:

 Río Culebrinas
 River Culebrinas
 Rio de Colovrinas

History 
Christopher Columbus is said to have anchored and come ashore near the mouth of the Culebrinas River in 1493. A stone cross monument was erected to mark the site, but it was destroyed by the 1918 San Fermín earthquake.

In the 1898 Military Notes on Puerto Rico by the U.S. it is written that Culebrina River "is bounded on the south and east by the Lares Mountain ridge, and on the north by small hills of little interest. From the Lares Mountains it flows from east to west
and empties on the west coast north of San Francisco de la Aguada, in the center of the bay formed between Point Peñas Blancas and Point San Francisco."

Flooding 
In 2007, Tropical Storm Olga caused flooding on the river, forcing an evacuation.

In late May, 2019 multiple areas in various municipalities suffered flooding, felled trees, landslides and closed highways when Río Culebrinas flooded. In San Sebastián, a road caved in. There is a bridge on PR-438 that goes over the Culebrinas River in barrio Magos and when the river floods the road is closed.

In mid 2018, the U.S. Army Corps of Engineers announced its list of projects for Puerto Rico. $400,000 was earmarked to study how to reduce damage caused by a flooding Río Culebrinas.

Watershed protection program 
In June 2018, a large project, by the Natural Resources Conservation Service (NRCS) and the Puerto Rico Department of Natural and Environmental Resources (PRDNER), to clear debris from Culebrinas River in Moca was deemed a success.

Gallery

See also 

 Puente de Coloso: NRHP listing in Aguada, Puerto Rico
 List of rivers of Puerto Rico

References

External links 
 Culebrinas River - The Columbia Gazetteer of North America at Bartleby.com

Rivers of Puerto Rico